The "Golden Dzyga" is a Ukrainian national film award given for professional achievements in the development of Ukrainian cinema. Founded in 2017 by the Ukrainian Film Academy, the first awards ceremony took place on April 20, 2017, at the "Fairmont Grand Hotel Kyiv."

Selection of films and determination of winners 
Submission of films for the First National Film Award lasted from February 20 to March 20, 2017. Films that premiered during 2016 — from January 1 to December 31 inclusive-were accepted for participation in the selection process. The full list of films (longlist) that competed in the competition for the First National Film award consisted of 54 films: 12 of them — full-length feature films, 15 — short feature films, 19 — documentaries, 8-animated. A total of 76 films were submitted, ⁣ Contenders were determined by closed non-commercial viewing of online copies of films.

The winners of the First National Film Prize were elected by all members of the Film Academy by a three-stage vote. Currently, the winners of the Film Award are determined by a two-stage vote of members of the Ukrainian Film Academy.

On April 3, 2017, the Board of the Film Academy published a short list of 17 nominees for the First National Film Award.

Prize 
The Golden Dzyga Award is awarded in the following 22 categories (2020):

 Best film
Best Director (Yuri Ilyenko award)
 Best Lead Actor
 Best Actress in a Leading Role
 Best Supporting Actor
 Best Supporting Actress
 Best Cinematographer
 Best Scenography
 Best Screenplay
 Best Composer
 Best Documentary
 Best Animated Film
 Best Short Film
 Best Makeup Artist (since 2018)
 Best Costume Designer (since 2018)
 Best Sound Director (since 2018)
 Best Song (Artist Awards) (since 2019)
 Award for the best visual effects
 Best Editing (award granted since 2019)
 Discovery of the Year
 Contribution to the development of Ukrainian cinematography
 Audience Award (an award granted since 2018)

Symbol 
The main symbol of the National Film Award is the "Golden Dzyga" statuette, which symbolizes the rapid and relentless development of Ukrainian cinema (ukr. дзиґа – eng. top (toy)). In addition, the title is reminiscent and tribute to the creative legacy of the outstanding cinematographer Dziga Vertov. Dziga  Vertov is an artistic name of David Abelovich Kaufman. D.A. Kaufman, was born in Białystok in 1896, died in Moscow in 1954. He became a pioneering and famous film documentalist, whose 1929-made Man with a Movie Camera was acclaimed - by the British magazine "Sight & Sound" as the best documentary film of all time.

The author of the award's title is Olga Zakharova, director of strategic marketing at Media Group Ukraine.

The statuette was designed by Ukrainian artist Nazar Bilyk, who described the "Golden Dzyga" as follows: "The main element of the composition is a frame made of film, a golden quadrangle that rotates dynamically, representing cinematography. In shape, the statuette resembles a whirlwind, fire, a scion, all of which symbolize the development and renewal of national cinema."

Ceremonies

See also 

Ukrainian Film Academy

References

Sources 
 Національна кінопремія
 Регламент Другої національної кінопремії
 Регламент Третьої національної кінопремії
 Регламент Четвертої Національної кінопремії

External links 
 
 

Ukrainian film awards
Awards established in 2017
2017 in Ukraine